Muhammad Hafeez (1 October 1943 – 9 August 2011) was a former Pakistani cyclist. He competed in the sprint, 1000m time trial and team pursuit events at the 1964 Summer Olympics.

References

1943 births
2011 deaths
Pakistani male cyclists
Olympic cyclists of Pakistan
Cyclists at the 1964 Summer Olympics
Place of birth missing